Chicago Stadium was an stadium in Chicago, Illinois, that opened in 1929, closed in 1994 and was demolished in 1995. It was the home of the National Hockey League's Chicago Blackhawks and the National Basketball Association's Chicago Bulls.

History
The Stadium hosted the Chicago Blackhawks of the NHL from 1929 to 1994 and the Chicago Bulls of the NBA from 1967 to 1994. The arena was the site of the first NFL playoff game in 1932; the 1932, 1940, and 1944 Democratic National Conventions; and the 1932 and 1944 Republican National Conventions, as well as numerous concerts, rodeo competitions, boxing matches, political rallies, and plays.

The Stadium was first proposed by Chicago sports promoter Paddy Harmon. Harmon wanted to bring an NHL team to Chicago, but he lost out to Col. Frederic McLaughlin. This team would soon be known as the Chicago Black Hawks (later 'Blackhawks'). Harmon then went on to at least try to get some control over the team by building a stadium for the Blackhawks to play in. He spent $2.5 million and borrowed more funds from friends, including James E. Norris, in order to build the stadium.

Opened on March 28, 1929, at a cost of $9.5 million, Chicago Stadium was the largest indoor arena in the world at the time. Detroit's Olympia stadium, built two years earlier, was a model for the Chicago Stadium and had a capacity of over 15,000 people. It was also the first arena with an air conditioning system. However, the system was fairly rudimentary by modern standards, and was memorably given to filling the arena with fog during late-season basketball and hockey games.

The Stadium sat 17,317 for hockey at the time of closure, though standing room pushed the "actual" attendance beyond that figure. The official attendance figures in the published game summaries were often given in round numbers, such as 18,500 or 20,000. The largest recorded crowd for an NHL game at the stadium was 20,069 for a playoff game between the Blackhawks and Minnesota North Stars on April 10, 1982.

Seating capacity

"The Madhouse on Madison"

In addition to the close-quartered, triple-tiered, boxy layout of the building, much of the loud, ringing noise of the fans could be attributed to the fabled 3,663-pipe Barton organ, boasting the world's largest theater organ console with 6 manuals (keyboards) and over 800 stops, and played by Al Melgard. Melgard played for decades during hockey games there, earning the Stadium the moniker "The Madhouse on Madison".
For years, it was also known as "The Loudest Arena in the NBA", due to its barn-shaped features. When the Stadium closed in 1994 the organ was removed and prepared to be installed in the 19th hole museum. Soon after the museum closed, sending the organ along with another theatre organ to a warehouse in Phoenix Arizona. In October 1996, a year after the stadium was razed, a propane tank explosion melted and destroyed both pipe organs, excluding the console.
The organ is currently in the residence of Phil Maloof and is in good working condition with new pipes.

In the Stanley Cup semifinals of 1971, when the Blackhawks scored a series-clinching empty-net goal in Game 7 against the New York Rangers, CBS announcer Dan Kelly reported, "I can feel our broadcast booth shaking! That's the kind of place Chicago Stadium is right now!" The dressing rooms at the Stadium were placed underneath the seats, and the cramped corridor that led to the ice, with its twenty-two steps, became the stuff of legend. Legend has it a German Shepherd wandered the bowels at night as "the security team."

During the 1973 Stanley Cup Finals against Montreal, Blackhawks owner Bill Wirtz had the horn of his yacht (Kahlenberg Q-3) installed in the building, and had it sound after Blackhawks goals. This practice would, in the ensuing years, become commonplace in professional hockey.

Nancy Faust, organist for 40 years at Chicago White Sox games, also played indoors at the Stadium, at courtside for Chicago Bulls home games from 1976 to 1984, and on the pipe organ for Chicago Blackhawks hockey there from 1985 to 1989. She was replaced at the keyboard in 1990 by Frank Pellico, who serves as Hawks organist to this day.

It also became traditional for Blackhawk fans to cheer loudly throughout the singing of the national anthems, especially when sung by Chicago favorite Wayne Messmer. Denizens of the second balcony often added sparklers and flags to the occasion. Arguably, the most memorable of these was the singing before the 1991 NHL All-Star Game, which took place during the Gulf War. This tradition has continued at the United Center. Longtime PA announcer Harvey Wittenberg had a unique monotone style: "Blackhawk goal scored by #9, Bobby Hull, unassisted, at 6:13." The Chicago Stadium also provided a unique fan experience. On the west side of the building was the Players/Employee/VIP Visitors Parking Lot. It is also where Teams/Bands/Politicians/Performers would enter the building through the legendary Gate 3 1/2 (Appropriately placed between Gates 3 and 4 on the North and South Sides). Although protected by fencing, it was where fans could see the talent get out of their cars or teams exit their buses before going into the building. It was also a great autograph and informal "meet and greet" opportunity.

In 1992, both the Blackhawks and the Bulls reached the finals in their respective leagues. The Blackhawks were swept in their finals by the Pittsburgh Penguins, losing at Chicago Stadium, while the Bulls won the second of their first of three straight NBA titles on their home floor against the Portland Trail Blazers.

Last analog game clock in any NHL arena
It was also the last NHL arena to retain the use of an analog dial-type large four-sided clock for timekeeping in professional hockey games. Boston Garden and the Detroit Olympia (as well as the Buffalo Memorial Auditorium in its pre-NHL days) had identical scoreboards but replaced them with digital timers in the mid-1960s, with Boston having their digital four-sided clock in use for the 1969–70 NHL season. After removing the balcony-edge game clocks at either end and at mid-ice zones of the Stadium, the replacement four-sided game clock suspended over center ice of the Stadium, built by Bulova as their "Sports Timer", was installed in Chicago in 1943. Each side of the clock had a large diameter 20-minute face in the center that kept the main game time for one period of ice hockey, with a set of shorter black-colored minute and longer red-colored sweep-second hands, and a pair of smaller, 5-minute capacity dual-concentric faces for penalty timekeeping, to the left and right of the primary 20-minute face — with each of the 5-minute penalty timers having its own single hand and each clock face, both the central main timer's dial and flanking penalty timer dials (when a penalty was counting down) illuminated from behind during gameplay. The "outer" face of each penalty timer had a single hand that avoided obscuration of the "inner" face and its own, "solid" single hand, through the use of metal rods forming the outer hand's "shaft", holding its hand's "pointer" head — the set of two concentric faces for each penalty timer dial could handle two penalties for each set, with an illuminated "2" on each penalty timer dial lighting up to display a minor penalty infraction. It was difficult to read how much time was left in a period of play on the main game timer's large face, as each minute of play was marked by a longer line on every third "seconds" increment on the central main dial, due to the minute hand's twenty-minute "full rotation" timing capacity for one period of ice hockey. The difficulty was compounded on the main central dial from the aforementioned minute and sweep-second hands being in constant motion during gameplay. The "Sports Timer's" only digital displays were for scoring and for penalized players' numbers, each digit comprising a six-high, four-wide incandescent light dot matrix display.

That clock eventually was replaced by a four-sided scoreboard with a digital clock, first used on September 21, 1975, in Blackhawks preseason play, crafted by the Day Sign Company of Toronto, much like the one used at the end of the 1960s (and constructed by Day Sign Company) to replace the nearly identical Bulova Sports Timer game-timekeeping device in the Boston Garden, and then in 1985 by another, this one with a color electronic message board. That latter scoreboard was built by White Way Sign, which would build scoreboards for the United Center.

The Stadium was also one of the last three NHL arenas (the others being Boston Garden and the Buffalo Memorial Auditorium) to have a shorter-than-regulation ice surface, as their construction predated the regulation. The distance was taken out of the neutral zone.

Demolition

After the Blackhawks and Bulls moved to the United Center, the Chicago Stadium was demolished in 1995. Its site is now a parking lot for the United Center across the street. CNN televised the demolition, showing devoted Blackhawks and Bulls fans crying as the wrecking ball hit the old building. The console of the Barton organ now resides in the Phil Maloof residence in Las Vegas, Nevada. Also, the center of the Chicago Bulls' floor resides in Michael Jordan's trophy room at his mansion in North Carolina.

A plaque with the words "Chicago Stadium – 1929–1994 – Remember The Roar" is located behind a statue of the Blackhawks' greatest players on the north side of the United Center.
Two friezes from Chicago Stadium were incorporated into a building at St. Ignatius College Prep School, 1076 W. Roosevelt Road.

Two of the Stadium's main parking lots, which are still used for United Center parking, retain signs that read "People's Stadium Parking".

Notable events

Basketball
1973, 1988: Chicago was the host city for the NBA All-Star Game.
1987: Michael Jordan of the Chicago Bulls scored 61 points on April 16  to become the only NBA player other than Wilt Chamberlain to top 3,000 points in a single season.
1991: Chicago Bulls won their first championship.
1992: Great Midwest Conference men's basketball tournament.
1992: Chicago Bulls won the second of three straight NBA titles in Game 6 of the NBA Finals. This would be the only time the Bulls clinched the championship while playing on the Stadium's floor, though they did it twice at the new United Center (in 1996 and again in 1997).
1993: Chicago Bulls won their third championship.
1994: The final Bulls home game at Chicago Stadium was played on May 20, a 93-79 Bulls win over the New York Knicks in game 6 of the Eastern Conference semifinals (the team would lose game 7 at Madison Square Garden in New York City).
1994: The final event at Chicago Stadium was Scottie Pippen's Ameritech Classic charity basketball game, which was organized through Reverend Jesse Jackson's Push-Excel program and was held on September 9, 1994. Michael Jordan, despite being in retirement at the time (he would return to basketball six months later), participated and scored 52 points, leading the White team to a 187–150 victory over Pippen's Red team. At the end of the game, Jordan kneeled and kissed the Bulls logo at center court.

Hockey
1934: The Blackhawks win the Stanley Cup on home ice by defeating the Detroit Red Wings 1–0 in the second overtime in game four of the Stanley Cup Finals.
1938: The Blackhawks win the Stanley Cup on home ice by defeating the Toronto Maple Leafs 4–1 in game four of the Stanley Cup Finals. This was the Blackhawks' last Stanley Cup win in Chicago Stadium. 
1961: Bobby Hull scored twice in Game 1 of the Stanley Cup finals, won 3-2 by the Chicago Blackhawks over the Detroit Red Wings. The Blackhawks would go on to win the Stanley Cup at Detroit's Olympia Stadium, winning the series 4–2. Later, the team made it to the finals five more times (1962, 1965, 1971, 1973, and 1992), but they lost in all those series. 
1961, 1974 and 1991: Stadium was host for the NHL All-Star Game.
1992: The last Stanley Cup Finals game at Chicago Stadium was played on June 1. The Pittsburgh Penguins swept the series 4–0 and won game 4 6–5, capturing their second consecutive Stanley Cup. 
1994: The final ice hockey game at Chicago Stadium was played on April 28. The Blackhawks lost to the Toronto Maple Leafs 1–0, eliminating them from the first round of the 1994 Stanley Cup playoffs. The only goal in the game, and last goal ever scored, came from Mike Gartner in the first period.

Football
1932: Due to a snowstorm followed by frigid temperatures, the Chicago Bears played the 1932 NFL championship game inside the Chicago Stadium against the Portsmouth Spartans (later the Detroit Lions). The Bears won 9–0.

Soccer
1984: The NASL held the only All-Star game ever played in its 17 outdoor and 4 indoor seasons. The All Stars defeat the host Chicago Sting 9-8 before 14,328 fans.

Boxing
1947: Often cited as one of the great bouts of the 20th Century, Rocky Graziano scored a sixth-round technical knockout of Tony Zale before 18,547 on July 16, 1947.
1951: In their sixth and final fight, Sugar Ray Robinson defeated Jake LaMotta on Valentine's Day with a 13th-round TKO.
1953: Undefeated heavyweight champion Rocky Marciano knocked out Jersey Joe Walcott on May 15 in the first round.

Concerts
1972: November 10–11: Jethro Tull
1974: November 1-2: Elton John Caribou Tour with Kiki Dee
1975: June 1–5 & 7th: Beach Boys and Chicago (Beachago Tour).
1975: Santana's Borboletta Tour came here on July 5.
1975: The Rolling Stones' Tour of the Americas '75 stopped here July 22–24.
1975: The Who performed here on December 4–5 during their 1975 tour.
1975–76: December 31-January 1: Frank Sinatra met the new year in Chicago Stadium, performing a concert with 23 songs.
1976: Paul McCartney's first three concerts in Chicago in 10 years; he performed May 31 through June 2 in his Wings Over America Tour. 
1977-78: Queen, 3 concerts: A Day at the Races Tour - January 28, 1977, News of the World Tour - December 5, 1977, Jazz Tour - December 7, 1978
1977: In the spring of 1977, Led Zeppelin played four shows here during their finalNorth American tour (they had previously played three concerts at this venue on their 1975 North American Tour and two concerts on their 1973 North American Tour). Two more were scheduled for later in the tour but were cancelled due to the death of Robert Plant's son. Tickets from the cancelled partial show on April 9 were to be honored at the rescheduled shows, which never materialized. (The band was booked to perform four concerts at the stadium as part of another North American tour in November 1980, but the tour was officially cancelled on September 27, two days after John Bonham's death.)
1977: Elvis Presley's last concert in Chicago was in the Stadium on May 1–2.
1977: Fleetwood Mac, July 23–24
1978: Billy Joel October 13, 1978. For his 52nd Street Tour.
1979: The Bee Gees performed two sold-out shows on July 30–31.
1981: Michael Jackson and his brothers brought their Triumph Tour to the Stadium on August 28.
1981: November 5, Electric Light Orchestra, opening act Hall & Oats.
1994: The final concert was held on March 10, featuring Pearl Jam, Urge Overkill and The Frogs.

In film
1961: Scenes from the 1962 version of The Manchurian Candidate depicting the Republican nomination convention, were filmed in the stadium. The scenes are set in New York's Madison Square Garden.

Other events
1932, 1940 and 1944: Democratic National Conventions, at which Franklin D. Roosevelt won his first, third and fourth nominations from the Democratic Party for President of the United States.
1932 and 1944: Republican National Conventions, at which Herbert C. Hoover and Thomas E. Dewey, respectively, would win the Republican Party's nomination for President of the United States. Both lost to Roosevelt.
1933: Funeral of Chicago mayor Anton J. Cermak, the sole fatality in an assassination attempt on President-elect Franklin Roosevelt.
1936: Presidential election rallies for both Republican Alfred Landon and Democrat Franklin D. Roosevelt. Roosevelt's rally drew a crowd of over 1 million, with more than 200,000 attendees overwhelming the stadium's capacity of 25,000.
1946: While waiting in a backstage area to go onto the arena floor during a rodeo, Roy Rogers proposed to Dale Evans.
1968: Months after winning a 1968 Winter Olympics gold medal, Peggy Fleming drew large crowds to the Stadium with the Ice Capades.

See also
 Ray Clay – Former Bulls public address announcer

References

External links

Chicago Stadium's Basketball History
Chicago Stadium's Ice Hockey History

1929 establishments in Illinois
1995 disestablishments in Illinois
American football venues in Chicago
Basketball Association of America venues
Basketball venues in Chicago
Boxing venues in Chicago
Chicago Bulls venues
Chicago Stags
Chicago Sting sports facilities
Defunct boxing venues in the United States
Defunct indoor arenas in Illinois
Defunct indoor soccer venues in the United States
Defunct indoor ice hockey venues in the United States
Defunct multi-purpose stadiums in the United States
Defunct National Football League venues
Defunct National Hockey League venues
Stadium
Demolished music venues in the United States
Demolished sports venues in Illinois
Demolished theatres in Illinois
Former National Basketball Association venues
Indoor arenas in Chicago
Indoor ice hockey venues in Chicago
Indoor soccer venues in Illinois
North American Soccer League (1968–1984) indoor venues
Sports venues completed in 1929
Sports venues demolished in 1995
Stadium
Wrestling venues in Chicago
Chicago Blackhawks